The 1996–97 season was Parma Associazione Calcio's seventh consecutive season in Serie A. The team competed in Serie A, the Coppa Italia, and the UEFA Cup, where it suffered a shock first round exit to Portuguese club Vitória de Guimarães.

Season review
Parma came the closest it had ever been to winning the Italian championship, but came up short by finishing only two points against Juventus. The season started with Luca Bucci still as Parma's starting keeper.  Young goalkeeper Gianluigi Buffon, along with new recruits Lilian Thuram, Enrico Chiesa and Hernán Crespo, proved to be the driving force in Parma's title bid, which nearly reached ultimate success. However, a dubious penalty for Juventus in a 1–1 draw against the Turin club in May sealed Juventus' title.

Players

Squad information
Squad at end of season

Transfers

Left club during season

Competitions

Serie A

League table

Results summary

Results by round

Matches

Coppa Italia

UEFA Cup

First round

Statistics

Players statistics

Goalscorers

Last updated: 1 June 1997

References

Parma Calcio 1913 seasons
Parma